IJustWantToBeCool is a Swedish comedy trio consisting of brothers Victor(born February 5, 1992) and Emil Beer(born October 28, 1994). and their cousin Joel Adolphson(born March 26, 1992).

The trio has become known by posting humorous videos on YouTube since 2011. Since they started, they have uploaded over 200 clips, eliciting over 230 million views. Their main channel has over 950,000 subscribers. IJustWantToBeCool has had two web-series on SVT called Semi and Konsten Att Få Sin Mamma Att Gråta (KAFSMAG) which was posted on SVTPlay. They have also made a series for the Swedish tv channelTV4 called Småstaden in 2017. IJustWantToBeCool has a channel on YouTube with the same name as the group. On 17 December 2011 the trio posted their first clip on YouTube called Svenskar Älskar Justin Bieber. IJustWantToBeCool has also been guests at Allsång på Skansen which is broadcast on SVT.

The trio has a second YouTube channel called IJustWantToBeCool2, which was created in 2012. It mainly consists of behind the scenes-content, whereas their main channel is for sketches. Their second channel IJustWantToBeCool2 also consists of vlogs, Q&A's, mukbang-videos, hauls, how-to-videos, challenges and much more.

References

External Links
 

Swedish YouTubers
1992 births
Living people